Scholes is a small village in the Rotherham borough of South Yorkshire, England, near the southern boundary of Wentworth Woodhouse, formerly the family seat of the Earls Fitzwilliam. The village is the location of Keppel's Column.

Scholes Coppice contains several archaeological features, including Caesar's Camp, an Iron Age fort, regarded as one of the best examples of its kind in South Yorkshire.

References

External links

Villages in South Yorkshire